Sericomyia chalcopyga is a species of syrphid fly in the family Syrphidae.

References

Further reading

External links

 

Eristalinae
Articles created by Qbugbot
Insects described in 1863
Taxa named by Hermann Loew
Hoverflies of North America